Pa Salieu Gaye (born 1 July 1997) is a British rapper and singer. In January 2020, he released his debut single "Frontline", which was the most-played track of 2020 on BBC Radio 1Xtra. He has since featured on songs with South London's SL for "Hit the Block", Meekz, M1llionz and Teeway for "Year of the Real" and joined BackRoad Gee and Ambush for the remix to "Party Popper". He has collaborated with artists such as FKA Twigs and SL. His style is renowned for blending elements of Afro-beats, grime and UK drill. In June 2020, he released "Betty" and "Bang Out". He released his debut mixtape titled Send Them to Coventry on 13 November 2020.

Biography 
Pa Salieu was born in Slough, where he spent the early stages of his life. His parents moved to the UK from The Gambia. He was named after his father's eldest brother, Pa Salieu, a police officer back home who died in his early twenties. His aunt is a Gambian folk singer.

Before his first birthday, his parents sent him back to The Gambia where he lived with his grandmother. There, he spent his formative years living in a household with his elder relatives. He describes his time there as the most important period in his life. At the age of 8, his mother brought him back to England. They moved to Hillfields, a suburb in the North of Coventry. His new home provided inspiration for his music career, becoming the focus of his breakout song "Frontline" released in January 2020, produced by Jevon. Through the song, he depicts life in Coventry and documents the neighbourhood that raised him.

Pa started rapping in 2017 under the name Tribal1, he released several videos with other artists in Coventry that gained a lot of buzz within the city. 
During this early period of making music, he was experimenting with different sounds and soon switched up from a drill/grime take to the afro-drill sound.

Pa started taking his music career seriously when a friend, who would always encourage him to make music instead of being on the roads, was killed. He recorded his first freestyle at a friend's small home studio setup, where he would regularly visit to write and record music. In October 2019, he was the victim of a shooting in Coventry where he was shot in the head but he survived and made a full recovery.

On 1 September 2018, Fidel Glasgow, a friend of Salieu was fatally stabbed near a nightclub; Salieu and a group of men chased another man from the scene who was attacked by the Salieu and the group. Salieu admitted to hitting the victim with a tree branch multiple times, and smashing a bottle to defend himself. On the 2nd December 2022, Salieu was convicted of possessing a bottle as an offensive weapon & violent disorder leading to a sentence of 33 months in prison.

Music career
Salieu is signed to Warner Records. He wrote "Frontline" in 20 minutes, and the music video was released on YouTube via Mixtape Madness. Since its release, it has accumulated over two million views and over three million streams. It has also become the most played track of 2020 on BBC 1Xtra, Reprezent Radio and Rinse FM. Salieu's music has received support from Virgil Abloh, BBC Radio 1's Annie Mac and Tiffany Calver as well as OVO Sound co-founder Oliver El Khatib.

The early momentum of "Frontline" has continued with a string of feature verses. He collaborated with South London rapper SL on the song "Hit the Block", as well as Meekz, M1llionz and Teeway on "Year of the Real". He also collaborated with Backroad Gee and Ambush for the remix to their track, "Party Popper". In June 2020, Salieu released two tracks – "Betty" and "Bang Out". He was premiered by Annie Mac and DJ Target on BBC Radio 1. He was described by the London Evening Standard as the rapper to watch in 2020, and has received strong support from J Hus. In January 2021, he was announced as the winner of the BBC Sound of... 2021. On 22 January 2021, he did his debut US TV performance on Jimmy Fallon "The Tonight Show" and performed "Frontline". Pa Salieu has been selected by GQ as one of 11 "new musicians who'll make 2021 better" and he was also on the cover of NME's first issue of 2021, NME 100 edition.

Discography

Mixtapes

Extended plays

Singles

References 

1998 births
English male rappers
Black British male rappers
English people of Gambian descent
Musicians from Coventry
UK drill musicians
Gangsta rappers
Living people